Alexandra is the feminine form of the given name Alexander. Thus it may be roughly translated as "defender of man" or "protector of man". The name Alexandra was one of the epithets given to the Greek goddess Hera and as such is usually taken to mean "one who comes to save warriors". The earliest attested form of the name is the Mycenaean Greek  ( or //), written in the Linear B syllabic script. Alexandra and its masculine equivalent, Alexander, are both common names in Greece as well as countries where Germanic, Romance, and Slavic languages are spoken.

Variants 
 Alejandra, Alejandrina (diminutive) (Spanish)
 Aleksandra (Александра) (Albanian, Bulgarian, Estonian, Latvian, Lithuanian, Macedonian, Polish, Russian, Serbo-Croatian)
 Alessandra (Italian)
 Alessia (Italian)
 Alex (various languages)
 Alexa (English, Romanian, Spanish)
 Alexandra (English, German, Dutch, French, Swedish, Norwegian, Danish, Icelandic, Greek, Portuguese, Romanian, Czech, Slovak, Hungarian, Catalan, Spanish, Italian, Russian, Ukrainian, Ancient Greek, Greek Mythology)
 Alexis, English
 Aliaksandra (Belarusian)
 Alikhandra /اليخاندرا (Egyptian)
 Alissandra/Alyssandra (Sicilian, Greek)
 Allie (English)
 Ally (English)
 Alya (Russian)
 Ālēkjāndrā / আলেকজান্দ্রা (Bengali)
 Αλεξάνδρα (Greek)
 Leska (Czech)
 Lesya (Ukrainian)
 Lexa (English)
 Lexie (English)
 Lexine (English)
 Lexi (English)
 Lexy (English)
 Oleksandra (Ukrainian)
 Sacha (French)
 Sanda (Romanian)
 Sandie (English)
 Sandra (Danish, Dutch, English, Polish, Estonian, Italian, Finnish, German, Icelandic, Latvian, Lithuanian, Norwegian, Portuguese, Romanian, Russian, Spanish, Serbo-Croatian, Slovene, Swedish)
 Sandy (English)
 Sascha (German)
 Sasha (Russian, Belarusian, Ukrainian, English, Spanish)
 Saskia (Slavic)
 Saundra (English, Scottish)
 Saša (Czech, Serbo-Croatian, Slovak, Slovene)
 Saška (Serbian)
 Shura (Russian)
 Sondra (English)
 Szandra (Hungarian)

People with the name

Empresses consort
 Princess Alexandra of Greece and Denmark (1870–1891), Empress consort of Russia and the wife of Grand Duke Paul Alexandrovich of Russia
 Alexandra Feodorovna (Alix of Hesse) (1872–1918), last Empress consort of Russia and the wife of Nicholas II of Russia.
 Alexandra Feodorovna (Charlotte of Prussia)  (1798–1860), Empress consort of Russia and the wife of Nicholas I of Russia

Queens consort
 Alexandra of Denmark (1844–1925), Queen consort of the United Kingdom and the wife of Edward VII
 Alexandra of Yugoslavia (1921–1993), last Queen consort of Yugoslavia and the wife of Peter II of Yugoslavia

Saints
 Saint Alexandra, martyr of the Diocletianic persecutions

Alexandra
 Alexandra (singer) (1942–1969), German singer
 Alexandra of Antioch, Greek noblewoman and the sister of Calliopius of Antioch
 Alexandra Aikhenvald (born 1957), Russian–Australian linguist
 Alexandra Aldridge (born 1994), American ice dancer
 Alexandra Allred (born 1965), American author and fitness instructor
 Alexandra Anghel (born 1997), Romanian freestyle wrestler
 Alexandra Ansanelli, American ballet dancer
 Alexandra Anstrell (born 1974), Swedish politician
 Alexandra Antonova (born 1991), Russian water polo player
 Alexandra Araújo (born 1972), Brazilian–born Italian water polo player
 Alexandra Arce (born 1977), Ecuadorian engineer and politician
 Alexandra Aristoteli (born 1997), Australian rhythmic gymnast
 Alexandra Asimaki (born 1988), Greek water polo player
 Alexandra Bachzetsis (born 1974), Greek–Swiss choreographer and visual artist
 Alexandra Backford (1942–2010), Aleut–American painter
 Alexandra Badea (born 1998), Romanian handballer
 Alexandra Balashova (1942–1969), Russian ballet dancer and choreographer
 Alexandra Barré (born 1958), Hungarian–born Canadian sprint kayaker
 Alexandra Barreto (born 1975), American actress
 Alexandra Bastedo (1946–2014), English actress
 Alexandra Beaton (born 1994/1995), Canadian actress
 Alexandra Bellow (born 1935), Romanian–American mathematician
 Alexandra Benado (born 1976), Chilean politician and football player
 Alexandra Béres (born 1976), Hungarian bodybuilder and curler
 Alexandra Berzon (born 1979), American investigative reporter and journalist
 Alexandra Beukes, South African politician
 Alexandra Beverfjord (born 1977), Norwegian journalist, crime fiction writer and newspaper editor
 Alexandra Bezeková (born 1992), Slovakian sprinter
 Alexandra Boltasseva (born 1978), Russian engineer and physicist
 Alexandra Borbély (born 1986), Slovakian–Hungarian actress
 Alexandra Botez (born 1995), American–Canadian chess player and Twitch streamer
 Alexandra Bounxouei (born 1987), Laotian–Bulgarian actress, model, and singer
 Alexandra Boyko (1916–1996), Russian tank commander
 Alexandra Bracken (born 1987), American author
 Alexandra Bradshaw (1888–1981), Canadian–American art professor and watercolor artist
 Alexandra Branitskaya (1754–1838), Russian courtier
 Alexandra Braun (born 1983), Venezuelan actress, model, and beauty queen
 Alexandra Breckenridge (born 1982), American actress, model, and photographer
 Alexandra Brooks (born 1995), English footballer
 Alexandra Bruce (born 1990), Canadian badminton player
 Alexandra Brushtein (1884–1968), Russian and Soviet writer, playwright, and memoirist
 Alexandra Buch (born 1979), German mixed martial artist
 Alexandra Bugailiskis (born 1956), Canadian diplomat
 Alexandra Bujdoso (born 1990), Hungarian–German sabre fencer
 Alexandra Bunton (born 1993), Australian basketball player
 Alexandra Burghardt (born 1994), German bobsledder and sprinter
 Alexandra Burke (born 1988), British singer
 Alexandra W. Busch (born 1975), German Roman archaeologist
 Alexandra Byrne (born 1962), English costume designer
 Alexandra Cardenas, Colombian composer
 Alexandra Carlisle (1886–1936), English actress and suffragist
 Alexandra Carpenter (born 1994), American ice hockey player
 Alexandra Caso (born 1987), Dominican volleyball player
 Alexandra Cassavetes, American actress and filmmaker
 Alexandra Castillo (born 1971), Chilean–Canadian actress and dancer
 Alexandra Chalupa, American lawyer and pro–Ukrainian activist
 Alexandra Chambon (born 2000), French rugby player
 Alexandra Chando (born 1986), American actress
 Alexandra Charles (born 1946), Swedish nightclub owner
 Alexandra Chasin (born 1961), American experimental writer
 Alexandra Chaves (born 2001), Canadian actress and dancer
 Alexandra Chekina (born 1993), Russian cyclist
 Alexandra Cheron (1983–2011), Dominican–American actress, businesswoman, model, and socialite
 Alexandra Chong, Jamaican entrepreneur
 Alexandra Chreiteh (born 1987), Lebanese author
 Alexandra Coletti (born 1983), Monégasque alpine skier
 Alexandra Cousteau (born 1976), French environmental activist and filmmaker
 Alexandra Cunha (born 1962), Mozambican–born Portuguese marine biologist
 Alexandra Cunningham (born 1972/73), American playwright, screenwriter, and television producer
 Alexandra Curtis (born 1991), American beauty queen
 Alexandra Čvanová (1897–1939), Ukrainian–born Czech operatic soprano
 Alexandra Daddario (born 1986), American actress
 Alexandra Dahlström (born 1984), Swedish actress
 Alexandra Dane (born 1940), South African–born English actress
 Alexandra Danilova (1903–1997), Russian ballet dancer
 Alexandra Dariescu (born 1985), Romanian pianist
 Alexandra Dascalu (born 1991), French volleyball player
 Alexandra Daum (born 1986), Austrian alpine skier
 Alexandra David-Néel (1868–1969), French explorer and spiritualist
 Alexandra Davies (born 1977), English–born Australian actress
 Alexandra de la Mora (born 1979), Mexican actress
 Alexandra Dementieva (born 1960), Russian artist
 Alexandra Denisova (1922–2018), Canadian ballet dancer
 Alexandra Deshorties (born 1975), French–Canadian operatic soprano
 Alexandra Dimoglou (born 1981), Greek Paralympic track and field athlete
 Alexandra Dindiligan (born 1997), Romanian handballer
 Alexandra DiNovi (born 1989), American actress
 Alexandra Dinu (born 1981), Romanian actress and television presenter
 Alexandra Diplarou (born 1981), Greek volleyball player
 Alexandra Dobolyi (born 1971), Hungarian politician
 Alexandra Dowling (born 1990), English actress
 Alexandra Duckworth (born 1987), Canadian snowboarder
 Alexandra Duel-Hallen, American electrical engineer
 Alexandra Dulgheru (born 1989), Romanian tennis player
 Alexandra Dunn (born 1967), American lawyer
 Alexandra von Dyhrn (1873–1945), German author and genealogist
 Alexandra Eade (born 1998), Australian artistic gymnast
 Alexandra Elbakyan (born 1988), Kazakhstani computer programmer
 Alexandra Eldridge (born 1948), American painter
 Alexandra Engen (born 1988), Swedish cross country cyclist
 Alexandra Eremia (born 1987), Romanian rhythmic gymnast
 Alexandra Ermakova (born 1992), Russian rhythmic gymnast
 Alexandra Escobar (born 1980, Ecuadorian weightlifter
 Alexandra Feigin (born 2002), Bulgarian figure skater
 Alexandra Feracci (born 1992), French karateka
 Alexandra Finder (born 1977), German actress
 Alexandra Fisher (born 1988), Kazakhstani athlete
 Alexandra Flood (born 1990), Australian operatic soprano
 Alexandra Fomina (born 1975), Ukrainian volleyball player
 Alexandra Försterling (born 1999), German amateur golfer
 Alexandra Föster (born 2002), German rower
 Alexandra Fouace (born 1979), French archer
 Alexandra Fuentes (born 1978), Puerto Rican actress and radio host
 Alexandra von Fürstenberg (born 1972), Hong Kong–born American entrepreneur, heiress, and socialite
 Alexandra Fusai (born 1973), French tennis player
 Alexandra Gage, Viscountess Gage (born 1969), British lecturer
 Alexandra Gallagher (born 1980), English artist
 Alexandra Gardner (born 1967), American composer
 Alexandra Daisy Ginsberg (born 1982), English–South African artist
 Alexandra Goujon (born 1972), French political scientist
 Alexandra Gowie (born 1990), South African–born Hungarian–Canadian ice hockey player
 Alexandra Grande (born 1990), Peruvian karateka
 Alexandra Grant (born 1973), American visual artist
 Alexandra Gripenberg (1857–1913), Finnish activist, author, and newspaper publisher
 Alexandra Gummer (born 1992), Australian soccer player
 Alexandra Hagan (born 1991), Australian rower
 Alexandra Hargreaves (born 1980), Australian rugby player
 Alexandra Harrison (born 2002), French ice hockey player
 Alexandra Hasluck (1908–1993), Australian author and historian
 Alexandra Hedison (born 1969), American actress, director, and photographer
 Alexandra Heidrich, German canoeist
 Alexandra Helbling (born 1993), Sri Lankan–born Swiss Paralympic athlete
 Alexandra Heminsley (born 1976), British journalist and writer
 Alexandra Henao, Venezuelan cinematographer and director
 Alexandra Herbríková (born 1992), Slovakian–Czech ice dancer
 Alexandra Hernandez (born 1981), French singer and songwriter
 Alexandra Hidalgo, Venezuelan–American documentarian
 Alexandra Hildebrandt (born 1959), German human rights activist
 Alexandra Mary Hirschi (born 1985), Australian social media personality and vlogger
 Alexandra Hoffman (born 1987), American beauty queen
 Alexandra Hoffmeyer (born 1988), American ice hockey player
 Alexandra Höglund (born 1990), Swedish football player
 Alexandra Holden (born 1977), American actress
 Alexandra Hollá (born 1994), Slovakian football player
 Alexandra Ashley Hughes (born 1985), Canadian singer and songwriter
 Alexandra Hulley (born 1997), Australian athlete
 Alexandra Hurst (born 1994), Northern Irish soccer player
 Alexandra Huynh (born 1994), Australian soccer player
 Alexandra Ianculescu (born 1991), Romanian–Canadian speed skater
 Alexandra Ievleva (born 1987), Russian figure skater
 Alexandra Issayeva (born 1982), Kazakhstani volleyball player
 Alexandra Ivanovskaya (born 1989), Russian beauty queen and model
 Alexandra Jackson (born 1952), Irish–English swimmer
 Alexandra Jiménez (born 1980), Spanish actress
 Alexandra Jóhannsdóttir (born 2000), Icelandic football player
 Alexandra Johnes (born 1976), American documentary film producer
 Alexandra Joner (born 1990), Norwegian dancer and singer
 Alexandra Jupiter (born 1990), French volleyball player
 Alexandra Kalinovská (born 1974), Czech modern pentathlete
 Alexandra Kamieniecki (born 1996), Polish figure skater
 Alexandra Kamp (born 1966), German actress and model
 Alexandra Kapustina (born 1984), Russian ice hockey player
 Alexandra Kasser (born 1967), American attorney and politician
 Alexandra Kavadas (born 1983), Greek football player
 Alexandra Kehayoglou (born 1981), Turkish–Argentine textile artist
 Alexandra Kenworthy (born 1932), American voice actress
 Alexandra Keresztesi (born 1983), Hungarian–born Argentine sprint canoer
 Alexandra Kerry (born 1973), American filmmaker
 Alexandra Killewald (born 1983), American sociology professor
 Alexandra Kim (1885–1918), Russian–Korean revolutionary political activist
 Alexandra Kleeman (born 1986), American writer
 Alexandra Kluge (1937–2017), German actress
 Alexandra Koefoed (born 1978), Norwegian sailor
 Alexandra Kolesnichenko (born 1992), Uzbekistani tennis player
 Alexandra Kollontai (1872–1952), Russian politician
 Alexandra Konofalskaya (born 1986), Belarusian sand animation artist
 Alexandra Korelova (born 1977), Russian equestrian
 Alexandra Korolkova (born 1984), Russian typeface designer
 Alexandra Kosinski (born 1989), American long-distance runner
 Alexandra Kosteniuk (born 1984), Russian chess grandmaster
 Alexandra Kotur, American fashion journalist
 Alexandra Kropotkin (1887–1966), Russian–American writer
 Alexandra Krosney, American actress
 Alexandra Kunová (born 1992), Slovakian figure skater
 Alexandra Kutas (born 1993), Ukrainian model
 Alexandra Lacrabère (born 1987), French handballer
 Alexandra Lamy (born 1971), French actress
 Alexandra Langley (born 1992), English badminton player
 Alexandra Lapierre, French author
 Alexandra Maria Lara (born 1978), Romanian–German actress
 Alexandra Larochelle (born 1993), Canadian writer
 Alexandra Larsson (born 1986), Swedish–Argentine model
 Alexandra Lazarowich, Cree–Canadian director and producer
 Alexandra Lebenthal (born 1964), American businesswoman
 Alexandra Leclère, French director and screenwriter
 Alexandra Lehti (born 1996), Finnish singer, known as Lxandra
 Alexandra Leitão (born 1973), Portuguese law professor and politician
 Alexandra Lemoine (born 1928), French artistic gymnast
 Alexandra Lencastre (born 1965), Portuguese actress
 Alexandra Lethbridge (born 1987), Hong Kong–born English photographer
 Alexandra Levit (born 1976), American writer
 Alexandra Lisney (born 1987), Australian cyclist and rower
 Alexandra London (born 1973), French actress
 Alexandra Longová (born 1994), Slovakian archer
 Alexandra López (born 1989), Spanish soccer player
 Alexandra Louis (born 1983), French lawyer and politician
 Alexandra Lúgaro (born 1981), Puerto Rican attorney, businesswoman, and politician
 Alexandra Lukin (born 1998), New Zealand field hockey player
 Alexandra Lunca (born 1995), Romanian soccer player
 Alexandra Lydon, American actress
 Alexandra Măceșanu (2003–2019), Romanian murder victim
 Alexandra Makovskaya (1837–1915), Russian landscape painter
 Alexandra Manly (born 1998), Australian cyclist
 Alexandra Mařasová (born 1965), Czech alpine skier
 Alexandra Mardell (born 1993), English actress
 Alexandra Marinescu (born 1982), Romanian artistic gymnast
 Alexandra Marinina (born 1957), Russian writer
 Alexandra Martin (born 1968), French politician
 Alexandra Marzo (born 1968), Brazilian actress and screenwriter
 Alexandra Mavrokordatou (1605–1684), Greek intellectual
 Alexandra Mazur (born 1986), Russian beauty queen
 Alexandra Meissnitzer (born 1973), Austrian alpine ski racer
 Alexandra Mendès (born 1963), Canadian politician
 Alexandra Merkulova (born 1995), Russian rhythmic gymnast
 Alexandra Micu, Romanian fashion model
 Alexandra Miller (born 1973), American businesswoman and politician
 Alexandra Milton (born 1967), French artist and illustrator
 Alexandra Mîrca (born 1993), Moldovan archer
 Alexandra Mitroshina (born 1994), Russian journalist
 Alexandra Mitsotaki, Greek activist and entrepreneur
 Alexandra Moreno (born 2000), Spanish racing cyclist
 Alexandra Morgenrood (born 1940), Zimbabwean diver
 Alexandra Morrison, Canadian photographer
 Alexandra Morton (born 1957), American conservation activist and marine biologist
 Alexandra Mousavizadeh (born 1970), Danish economist
 Alexandra Mueller (born 1988), American tennis player
 Alexandra Muñoz (born 1992), Peruvian volleyball player
 Alexandra Munteanu (born 1980), Romanian alpine skier
 Alexandra Najarro (born 1993), Canadian figure skater
 Alexandra Nancarrow (born 1993), Australian tennis player
 Alexandra Ndolo (born 1986), German–born Kenyan épée fencer
 Alexandra Nechita (born 1985), Romanian–American cubist painter and philanthropist
 Alexandra Nekvapilová (1919–2014), Czech alpine skier
 Alexandra Neldel (born 1976), German actress
 Alexandra Nereïev (born 1976), French painter and sculptor
 Alexandra Nemich (born 1995), Kazakhstani synchronized swimmer
 Alexandra Nessmar (born 1994), Swedish racing cyclist
 Alexandra Newton, South African pharmacology professor
 Alexandra Niepel (born 1970), British tennis player
 Alexandra Nikiforova (born 1993), Russian actress
 Alexandra Norman (born 1983), Canadian squash player
 Alexandra Obolentseva (born 2001), Russian chess player
 Alexandra Ocles (born 1979), Ecuadorian educator and politician
 Alexandra Oliver (born 1970), Canadian poet
 Alexandra Olsson (born 1998), Finnish handballer
 Alexandra Opachanova (born 1989), Kazakh rower
 Alexandra Oquendo (born 1984), Puerto Rican volleyball player
 Alexandra Ordolis (born 1986), Greek–Canadian actress
 Alexandra Osborne (born 1995), Australian tennis player
 Alexandra Panova (born 1989), Russian tennis player
 Alexandra Papageorgiou (born 1980), Greek hammer thrower
 Alexandra Park (born 1989), Australian actress
 Alexandra Pascalidou (born 1970), Greek–Swedish author and columnist
 Alexandra Paschalidou-Moreti (1912–2010), Greek architect
 Alexandra Patsavas (born 1968), Greek–American music supervisor
 Alexandra Pelosi (born 1970), American documentarian and journalist
 Alexandra Penney, American artist, author, and journalist
 Alexandra Perper (born 1991), Moldovan tennis player
 Alexandra Petkovski, Canadian composer
 Alexandra Petrova (1980–2000), Russian beauty queen and model
 Alexandra Picatto (born 1983), American accountant and child actress
 Alexandra Pierce (1934–2021), American composer and pianist
 Alexandra Piscupescu (born 1994), Romanian rhythmic gymnast
 Alexandra Podkolzina (born 1985), Russian–American tennis player
 Alexandra Podryadova (born 1989), Kazakhstani judoka
 Alexandra Polivanchuk (born 1990), Swedish deaf swimmer
 Alexandra Pomales (born 1995), American actress
 Alexandra Popp (born 1991), German soccer player
 Alexandra Potter (born 1970), English author
 Alexandra Poulovassilis, Greek–English computer scientist
 Alexandra Powers, American actress
 Alexandra Pringle (born 1952/1953), British publisher
 Alexandra Quinn (born 1973), Canadian pornographic actress
 Alexandra Radius (born 1942), Dutch ballet dancer
 Alexandra Raeva (born 1992), Russian curler
 Alexandra Raffé, Canadian film and television producer
 Alexandra Ramniceanu (born 1976), French film producer and screenwriter
 Alexandra Rapaport, Swedish actress
 Alexandra Razarenova (born 1990), Russian triathlete
 Alexandra Recchia (born 1988), French karateka
 Alexandra Reid (born 1989), American rapper and singer
 Alexandra Rexová (born 2005), Slovakian blind alpine skier
 Alexandra Richards (born 1986), American artist and model
 Alexandra Rickham (born 1981), Jamaican–born English Paralympic sailor
 Alexandra Richter (born 1967), Brazilian actress
 Alexandra Ridout (born 1998/99), English jazz trumpeter
 Alexandra Ripley (1934–2004), American writer
 Alexandra Roach (born 1987), Welsh actress
 Alexandra Robbins, American author, journalist, and lecturer
 Alexandra Roche, Lady Roche (born 1934), British philanthropist
 Alexandra Rochelle (born 1983), French volleyball player
 Alexandra Rodionova (born 1984), Russian bobsledder
 Alexandra Rojas (born 1995), American activist and political commentator
 Alexandra Rosenfeld (born 1986), French beauty queen and model
 Alexandra Rotan (born 1996), Norwegian singer and songwriter
 Alexandra Rout (born 1993), New Zealand figure skater
 Alexandra Rozenman (born 1971), Russian–born American graphic designer, illustrator, and painter
 Alexandra Rutherford, Canadian psychology professor
 Alexandra Rutlidge (born 1988), English water polo player
 Alexandra Saduakassova (born 2002), Kazakh sport shooter
 Alexandra Sahlen (born 1982), American soccer player
 Alexandra Salmela (born 1980), Slovakian author
 Alexandra Salvador (born 1995), Canadian–born Ecuadorian soccer player
 Alexandra Savior (born 1995), American singer and songwriter
 Alexandra Sharp (born 1997), Australian basketball player
 Alexandra Shevchenko (born 1988), Ukrainian radical feminist activist
 Alexandra Shimo, Canadian writer
 Alexandra Shipp, American actress and singer
 Alexandra Shiryayeva (born 1983), Russian beach volleyball player
 Alexandra Shiva, American documentarian
 Alexandra Shulman (born 1957), English journalist
 Alexandra Sicoe (1932–2019), Romanian sprinter
 Alexandra Sidorovici (1906–2000), Romanian politician
 Alexandra Silber, American actress, educator, singer, and writer
 Alexandra Silk (born 1963), American pornographic actress
 Alexandra Silocea (born 1984), Romanian–born French pianist
 Alexandra Silva (born 1984), Portuguese computer scientist
 Alexandra Smirnoff (1838–1913) Finnish pomologist
 Alexandra Sobo (born 1987), Romanian volleyball player
 Alexandra Socha (born 1990), American actress
 Alexandra Soler (born 1983), French artistic gymnast
 Alexandra Solnado, Portuguese writer
 Alexandra Sokoloff, American novelist and screenwriter
 Alexandra Sorina (1899–1973), Belarusian actress
 Alexandra Soumm (born 1989), Russian–born French violinist
 Alexandra Sourla (born 1973), Greek equestrian
 Alexandra Stan (born 1989), Romanian singer
 Alexandra Stepanova (born 1995), Russian ice dancer
 Alexandra Stevenson (born 1980), American tennis player
 Alexandra Stewart (born 1939), Canadian actress
 Alexandra Stréliski (born 1985), Canadian composer and pianist
 Alexandra Styron, American author and professor
 Alexandra Subțirică (born 1987), Romanian handballer
 Alexandra Suda (born 1981), Canadian art historian
 Alexandra Takounda (born 2000), Cameroonian soccer player
 Alexandra Talomaa (born 1975), Swedish songwriter
 Alexandra Tavernier (born 1993), French hammer thrower
 Alexandra Teague, American poet
 Alexandra Techet, American marine engineer
 Alexandra Tegleva (1894–1955), Russian nursemaid to the children of the Imperial family
 Alexandra Tessier (born 1993), Canadian rugby player
 Alexandra Thein (born 1963), German politician
 Alexandra Tilley (born 1993), Scottish alpine ski racer
 Alexandra Timoshenko (born 1972), Ukrainian rhythmic gymnast
 Alexandra Tolstaya (1884–1979), Russian secretary and the youngest daughter of Leo Tolstoy
 Alexandra Touretski (born 1994), Swiss freestyle swimmer
 Alexandra Trică (born 1985), Romanian volleyball player
 Alexandra Trofimov (born 1999), Romanian soccer player
 Alexandra Trusova (born 2004), Russian figure skater
 Alexandra Tsiavou (born 1985), Greek rower
 Alexandra Tüchi (born 1983), Austrian bobsledder
 Alexandra Tydings (born 1972), American actress
 Alexandra Udženija (born 1975), Serbian–Czech politician
 Alexandra Vafina (born 1990), Russian ice hockey player
 Alexandra Valetta-Ardisson (born 1976), French politician
 Alexandra Vandernoot (born 1965), Belgian actress
 Alexandra Vasilieva (born 1995), Russian figure skater
 Alexandra Vela, Ecuadorian lawyer and politician
 Alexandra Verbeek (born 1973), Dutch sailor
 Alexandra Viney (born 1992), Australian Paralympic rower
 Alexandra Vinogradova, Russian volleyball player
 Alexandra Völker (born 1989), Swedish politician
 Alexandra Voronin (1905–1993), Russian wife of Vidkun Quisling
 Alexandra Vydrina (1988–2021), Russian linguist
 Alexandra Wager, American child actress and the daughter of Michael Wager
 Alexandra Wallace (born 1975/76), American news media executive
 Alexandra Walsham (born 1966), English–Australian historian
 Alexandra Waluszewski (born 1956), Swedish professor and organizational theorist
 Alexandra Waterbury, American ballet dancer and model
 Alexandra Wedgwood (born 1938), English architectural historian
 Alexandra Wejchert (1921–1995), Polish–Irish sculptor
 Alexandra Wenk (born 1995), German swimmer
 Alexandra Wescourt (born 1975), English actress
 Alexandra Wester (born 1994), Gambian–born German long jumper
 Alexandra von der Weth (born 1968), German operatic soprano
 Alexandra Williams, American rugby player
 Alexandra Wong (born 1956), Hong Kong activist
 Alexandra Worden, American genome scientist and microbial ecologist
 Alexandra Worisch (born 1965), Austrian synchronized swimmer
 Alexandra Zabelina (1937–2022), Soviet fencer
 Alexandra Zaharias (born 1929), American ballet teacher
 Alexandra Zapruder (born 1969), American author and editor
 Alexandra Zaretsky (born 1987), Israeli ice dancer
 Alexandra Zarini, Italian–American daughter of Patricia Gucci
 Alexandra Zazzi (born 1966), Italian–born Swedish chef, journalist, and television presenter
 Alexandra Zertsalova (born 1982), Kyrgyz swimmer
 Alexandra Zhukovskaya (1842–1899), Russian–German lady-in-waiting
 Alexandra Zimmermann, English conservation scientist
 Alexandra Zvorigina (born 1991), Russian ice dancer

Aleksandra 
 Aleksandra Andreevna Antonova (1932–2014), Russian, Kildin Sámi teacher, writer, poet and translator
 Aleksandra Avramović (born 1982), Serbian volleyball player
 Aleksandra Crnčević (born 1987), Serbian volleyball player
 Aleksandra Crvendakić (born 1996), Serbian basketball player
 Aleksandra Cvetićanin (born 1993), Serbian volleyball player
 Aleksandra Dimitrova (born 2000), Russian chess master
 Aleksandra Dulkiewicz (born 1979), Polish lawyer
 Aleksandra von Engelhardt (1754–1838), Russian lady-in-waiting
 Aleksandra Klepaczka (born 2000), Polish beauty pageant titleholder
 Aleksandra Krunić (born 1993), Serbian tennis player
 Aleksandra Maltsevskaya (born 2002), Russian chess master
 Aleksandra Przegalińska (born 1982), Polish futurist
 Aleksandra Ranković (born 1980), Serbian volleyball player
 Aleksandra Stepanović (born 1994), Serbian volleyball player
 Aleksandra Vukajlović (born 1997), Serbian handball player
 Aleksandra Wozniak (born 1987), Canadian tennis player
 Aleksandra Ziółkowska-Boehm (born 1949), Polish writer

Fictional characters 
 Alexandra Brooks DiMera, a.k.a. Lexie Carver, character in the NBC soap opera Days of Our Lives
 Alexandra Dunphy, a.k.a. Alex Dunphy, character in the popular television series Modern Family
 Alexandra Mack, a.k.a. Alex Mack, titular lead character in the popular television series The Secret World of Alex Mack
 Alexandra Nuñez, a.k.a. Alex Nuñez, character in the Canadian television drama Degrassi: The Next Generation
 Alexandra the Royal Baby Fairy, character in the British book series Rainbow Magic
 Alexandra Margarita Russo, a.k.a. Alex Russo, character in the Disney Channel television series Wizards of Waverly Place, played by Selena Gomez
 Alexandra, Nikita character
 Alexandra Grey, a.k.a. Lexie Grey, character in the ABC medical drama Grey's Anatomy
 Alexandra "Alex" Cahill, character in the 1990s television series Walker, Texas Ranger
 Alexandra Borgia, an Assistant District Attorney in Law & Order, played by Annie Parisse
 Alexandra Cabot, an Assistant District Attorney in Law & Order: Special Victims Unit, played by Stephanie March
 Alexandra Eames, a detective in Law & Order Criminal Intent, played by Kathryn Erbe
 Alexandra Garcia, a character in the anime and manga series Kuroko's Basketball
 Aleksandra Billewicz, a character in Deluge by Henryk Sienkiewicz
 Alexandra Vladimirovna Litvyak, a.k.a. Sanya V. Litvyak, a character from the anime/manga franchise Strike Witches 
 Aleksandra 'Zarya' Zaryanova, a Russian weightlifter turned soldier in the video game Overwatch
 Alexandra Vause, a.k.a. Alex Vause, imprisoned drug dealer and love interest to protagonist to Piper Chapman in Netflix's Orange Is The New Black
 Alexandra Danvers, a.k.a. Alex Danvers, Kara Danvers' sister in Supergirl
 Alexandra, the main antagonist in The Wildwood Chronicles
 Alexandra Finch, sister of Atticus Finch in the 1960 novel To Kill A Mockingbird

See also 
 Alexandra Park (disambiguation)
 Alexandria (given name)
 Alexander

References 

Feminine given names
Greek feminine given names
Romanian feminine given names
Serbian feminine given names
English feminine given names
French feminine given names